Morgan Smith-Goodwin (born March 29, 1986) is an American actress. She has had recurring roles on television series Veep and Messiah. She is best known as Red, the "Wendy's Girl" in TV commercial ads for Wendy's restaurants in 2012–16.

Early life and education
Born and raised in Cullman, Alabama, Smith earned a Bachelor of Arts degree in theatre from Birmingham–Southern College.

Career 
After graduating from college, she moved to New York City, where she had performed in concerts, readings, and benefits. She was an original cast member of the Off-Broadway production, Freckleface Strawberry.

Smith gained national attention when she was selected to be the face of Wendy's Restaurants' advertising campaign, titled Now That's Better. Television commercials carrying that theme began airing in April 2012. Naturally a dark blonde, her hair was dyed "orangey red" for the commercial role. Smith relocated to Los Angeles, CA after being cast as series regular Shelby Fox opposite Craig T. Nelson in NBC's reboot of Coach. After the show was not picked up, she went on to recur as Candi Caruso in Seasons 5 and 6 of Veep. She recurred as Agent Alison Rhymer in the Netflix series Messiah.

Personal life
Smith is married to David Ridgway "Dave" Goodwin, manager of Gramercy Tavern in New York City. The family makes their main residence in Los Angeles, shuttling between there and New York City.

Filmography

Television

Video games

References

External links

1985 births
Living people
21st-century American actresses
Actresses from Alabama
American musical theatre actresses
American stage actresses
American television personalities
American women television personalities
Birmingham–Southern College alumni
People from Cullman, Alabama